The 2003 Grand Prix Americas was the sixteenth round of the 2003 CART World Series season, held on September 28, 2003, on the streets of downtown Miami, Florida.

Qualifying results

Race

Caution flags

Notes 

 New Track Record Adrian Fernández 44.253 (Qualification Session #2)
 New Race Record Mario Domínguez 2:03:19.401
 Average Speed 75.533 mph

References

External links
 Full Weekend Times & Results

Miami
Grand Prix Americas (Champ Car Race)
Grand Prix Americas